VI High School – King Sigismund Augustus is a secondary school in the Bojary district of the city of Białystok in Poland. The school was founded in 1915 and its alumni include the inventor of Esperanto . The school is named after the sixteenth century King Sigismund II Augustus.

The school was based in buildings that were the Realschule in the city. This school had started much earlier and was attended by L. L. Zamenhof from 1869 to 1871 when his family then moved to Warsaw. The other famous person who attended the school was Ignacy Hryniewiecki, the assassin of the Tzar of Russia Alexander II.

120 students from this school were involved in the Polish fight for independence in 1917-20.

In 2008, the school was opened as part of a Jewish Heritage Trail organised by local university students.

References

Education in Białystok
Educational institutions established in 1915
Schools in Poland
1915 establishments in the Russian Empire